Peter Kwasi Nortsu-Kotoe (born 6 May 1956) is a Ghanaian politician and member of the Seventh Parliament of the Fourth Republic of Ghana representing the Akatsi North Constituency in the Volta Region on the ticket of the National Democratic Congress.

Early life 
Nortsu-Kotoe was born on 6 May 1956. He hails from Kpeduhoe in Volta Region of Ghana.

Education 
Nortsu-Kotoe is a graduate of the University of Ghana with a bachelor of degree in English. He holds a master of development management  from the Ghana Institute of Management and Public Administration.

Career
Nortsu-Kotoe is an educationist by profession. He was a tutor at Accra Academy and an assistant director of the Ghana Education Service by rank.

Politics
Nortsu-Kotoe was the District Chief Executive of the Akatsi District and the Akatsi South District from April 2009 until entering parliament on 7 January 2013. He was elected to represent the Akatsi North Constituency on the ticket of the National Democratic Congress during the 2012 Ghanaian general election. In 2016, he was elected again to represent the constituency for the next four years in parliament.

Personal life
Nortsu-Kotoe is married with three children. He identifies as a Christian and a member of the Evangelical Presbyterian Church, Ghana.

Employment 
 Ghana Education Service (tutor, Accra Academy, Bubiashie-Accra / Assistant Director)
 District Chief Executive (Akatsi District / Akatsi South District), April, 2009 – January 6, 2013
 MP (January 7, 2013 – present; 2nd term)

References

Ghanaian MPs 2013–2017
Ghanaian MPs 2017–2021
1956 births
Living people
National Democratic Congress (Ghana) politicians
University of Ghana alumni
Ghanaian MPs 2021–2025